Broughton is a village and civil parish in the Test Valley district of Hampshire, England, about  north of Romsey.

The Manor of Broughton is recorded in the Domesday Book and was held at different times by the Earl of Southampton, and the Duke of Kingston-upon-Hull. The current manor house is a Grade II* listed building, dating from the 18th century.

The Church of England parish church of St Mary the Virgin dates from the 12th century.

The 19th-century Baptist chapel has been closed for worship and sold for development.

The 2001 census recorded a parish population of 1,029, reducing to 1,003 at the 2011 Census.

Near the village are many farms, including three sheep farms and one buffalo meat farm.

Education

State
Primary:
 Broughton Primary School

Twin towns
Broughton is twinned with:

 Sauve, France

References

External links

Civil parishes in Hampshire
Test Valley
Villages in Hampshire